Jane Gray Nelson 
(born October 5, 1951) 
is an American businesswoman and former educator who serves as the Secretary of State of Texas since 2023. She was a Texas state senator who represented Texas Senate District 12. She was elected to the Senate in 1992 after serving two two-year terms (1988–1992) on the Texas State Board of Education. In 2023, Governor Greg Abbott appointed Nelson to succeed John B. Scott as Secretary of State. She was sworn in to that office on Saturday, January 7.

Texas Senate
Nelson is the highest-ranking Republican woman in the Texas Senate. The tenth woman ever elected to the Texas Senate, she was the first Republican woman ever appointed chair of a standing committee and now holds the distinction of being longest-serving chair of the Senate Health and Human Services Committee in Texas history. In 2015, she was appointed chair of the Senate Finance Committee, being the first woman to hold the position in the history of the Texas Senate.  She also serves as chair of the Sunset Advisory Commission.

During the 2013 legislative session, Nelson authored 40 bills that were passed into law by the Legislature, and she served as the Senate sponsor on 30 successful bills authored by House members. She served on 19 conference committees, including for SB 1, the appropriations bill.  Nelson chaired the Article II workgroup, which increased the women's health budget by $100 million and made significant new investments in mental health and Child Protective Services.

In October 2019, the Texas Parent Teacher Association named Nelson a Texas PTA Champion for Children for her leadership during the 86th Legislative Session.

Senate Health and Human Services Committee
In July 2013, Nelson presided over a 16-hour hearing on an abortion bill that drew testimony from over 3,800 people, including 357 who provided oral testimony. The bill, HB 3, sought to ban abortions after 20 weeks of pregnancy. The bill also required abortion facilities to upgrade to ambulatory surgical standards.

Retirement from the Texas Senate
In July 2021, Nelson announced she will not seek an 11th term to the Texas Senate.

Senate Finance Committee 
In 2014 Senator Nelson was appointed chair of the Senate Finance Committee, the first woman of either party to hold that position. In that capacity she authored four state budgets. Her chairmanship ended in January 2022. In June 2022, the Senate Finance committee dedicated its conference room to Senator Nelson in her honor.

References

External links
 Campaign website
 State legislative page
Project Vote Smart - Senator Jane Gray Nelson (TX) profile
Politifact Check Senator Jane Gray Nelson (TX)
Follow the Money - Jane Nelson
2006 2004 2002 2000 campaign contributions

1951 births
Living people
Presidents pro tempore of the Texas Senate
Republican Party Texas state senators
People from Flower Mound, Texas
American businesspeople
Women state legislators in Texas
21st-century American politicians
21st-century American women politicians
Secretaries of State of Texas